Sojitra is a village in the Indian state of Gujarat. It is in the Anand district, situated at 22°33′N 72°43′E. Its nearest villages are Isnav (4 km away), Dabhou (6 km away), Gada (4 km), Devataj (2 km), and Limbali (3 km). The village is home to several schools, including Smt. H.J. Patel Primary School for Girls, inaugurated by the Governor of Gujarat in 2006 and The M.M. High School and Library. Sojitra also has a number of temples dedicated to different deities of Hindu and Jain faiths.

References

External links
WikiMapia view of Dabhou
WikiMapia view of Isnav

Villages in Anand district